Alexander Andronikashvili also known as Andronikov (1871 – 1923) was a Georgian military commander and anti-Soviet resistance leader. 

Of an old noble family, Andronikashvili served in the Imperial Russian army and was promoted to the rank of general in World War I. He then served for the General Staff of the military of the newly independent Democratic Republic of Georgia. After the republic's fall to the Soviets (1921) he became one of the leaders of an underground independence movement. Andronikashvili was arrested by the Cheka along with his associates and shot at the outskirts of Tbilisi on May 19, 1923.

References 

1871 births
1923 deaths
Generals from Georgia (country)
Nationalists from Georgia (country)
Nobility of Georgia (country)
Imperial Russian Army generals
People from Georgia (country) executed by the Soviet Union
Aleksandre
People of World War I from Georgia (country)
Executed people from Georgia (country)